Aldo Antonio Quintanilla Montes (born 18 May 1995) is a Mexican professional footballer who plays as a forward.

Career 
Quintanilla joined United Soccer League side Rio Grande Valley FC on 16 March 2018. He made his professional debut on 31 March 2018, playing in a 2–2 draw with Sacramento Republic. On 6 June 2018, Quintanilla was loaned to the Houston Dynamo for their US Open Cup game and scored a brace in a 5–0 win over NTX Rayados.

On 7 September 2020, Quintanilla joined USL Championship side Austin Bold.

References

External links 
 

1995 births
Living people
Mexican footballers
Mexican expatriate footballers
Expatriate soccer players in the United States
Association football forwards
Rio Grande Valley FC Toros players
USL Championship players
Houston Dynamo FC players
Mexican expatriate sportspeople in the United States
Austin Bold FC players